Levene is a surname. Notable people with the surname include:

Allan Levene, (born 1949 or 1950), British American information technology specialist and political candidate
George Levene (1885–1930), American football player and coach at the college level
Gus Levene (1911-1979), American composer, arranger, orchestrator, guitarist
Gustavo Gabriel Levene (1905–1987), Argentinian historian and writer
Harry Levene, English boxing promoter, associated with Terry Lawless
Howard Levene (1914–2003), American statistician and geneticist
John Levene (born 1941), English film and television actor
Keith Levene (1957–2022), English musician
Peter Levene (born 1941), English businessman and nobleman
Philip Levene (1926-1973), English television writer, actor, and producer
Phoebus Levene (1869–1940), biochemist who identified the components of DNA
Rebecca Levene, British author
Sam Levene (1905–1980), American stage and film actor

See also 
Levene's test, a statistical test used to assess variance between data sets
Stora Levene, a locality in Västra Götaland County, Sweden
Levine